Rodrigo Alonso (born February 11, 1982) is an Argentine football defender who plays for Club Almirante Brown of the Primera B Metropolitana

References
 
 

1982 births
Living people
Argentine expatriate footballers
Argentine footballers
Flandria footballers
Club Atlético Huracán footballers
Deportes Concepción (Chile) footballers
Primera B de Chile players
Expatriate footballers in Chile
Club Atlético Fénix players
People from Hurlingham Partido
Association football defenders
Sportspeople from Buenos Aires Province